Centrosomal protein 170kDa, also known as CEP170, is a protein that in humans is encoded by the CEP170 gene.

Function 

The product of this gene is a component of the centrosome, a non-membraneous organelle that functions as the major microtubule organizing center in animal cells. During interphase, the encoded protein localizes to the sub-distal appendages of mature centrioles, which are microtubule-based structures thought to help organize centrosomes. During mitosis, the protein associates with spindle microtubules near the centrosomes. The protein interacts with the intraflagellar transport protein 81 (IFT81), the SH3-domain containing protein PRAX-1, and is phosphorylated by cyclin dependent kinase 1 (Cdk1) and polo-like kinase 1 (PLK1), and functions in maintaining microtubule organization, cell morphology and cilium stability.

The human genome contains a putative transcribed pseudogene. Several alternatively spliced transcript variants of this gene have been found, but the full-length nature of some of these variants has not been determined.

References

External links
 
 PDBe-KB provides an overview of all the structure information available in the PDB for Human Centrosomal protein of 170 kDa (CEP170)

Further reading

Centrosome